Paul Halpern (born 1961) is an American author and Professor of Physics at Saint Joseph's University in Philadelphia.

Life 
Halpern received a Ph.D in theoretical physics, an M.A. in physics and a B.A. in physics and mathematics. He was also the recipient of a Guggenheim Fellowship, Fulbright Scholarship, and an Athenaeum Society Literary Award.

He has written many popular science books and articles, including the books The Cyclical Serpent, Cosmic Wormholes and The Great Beyond. He has also appeared on the 1994 PBS series Futurequest, as well as the National Public Radio show "Radio Times."

In 2007, he published a book based on The Simpsons titled What's Science Ever Done for Us. He later appeared in The Simpsons 20th Anniversary Special – In 3-D! On Ice!.

Halpern published Einstein's Dice and Schrödinger's Cat in 2015, The Quantum Labyrinth: How Richard Feynman and John Wheeler Revolutionized Time and Reality in 2017, Synchronicity: The Epic Quest to Understand the Quantum Nature of Cause and Effect in 2020, and Flashes of Creation: George Gamow, Fred Hoyle, and the Great Big Bang Debate in 2021.

Works 
 Time Journeys: A search for Cosmic Destiny and Meaning, McGraw-Hill Professional Publishing, 1990, 
 Cosmic Wormholes: The Search for Interstellar Shortcuts, Plume, 1993. 
 The Cyclical Serpent: Prospects for an Ever-Repeating Universe, 1995; 
 
 The Pursuit of Destiny: A History of Prediction, Perseus Pub., 2000, 
 Countdown to Apocalypse: A Scientific Exploration of the End of the World, 2000
 
 Faraway Worlds: Planets Beyond Our Solar System, 2004
 
 Brave New Universe: Illuminating the Darkest Secrets of the Cosmos, coauthor Paul S. Wesson, 2006, 
   (See also The PTA Disbands#Reception.)

References

External links

Paul Halpern, Saint Joseph's University
Paul Halpern Biography
Paul Halpern: Science Books and Articles, National Association of Science Writers
Books by Paul Halpern, National Association of Science Writers
Paul Halpern Interview

1961 births
21st-century American physicists
Living people
Fulbright alumni